Markus Böcskör (born 1 October 1982) is an Austrian footballer who plays as a goalkeeper for SC Bad Sauerbrunn in Landesliga Burgenland. Besides Austria, he has played in South Africa.

References

Austrian footballers
Austrian Football Bundesliga players
2. Liga (Austria) players
Austrian expatriate footballers
Austrian expatriate sportspeople in South Africa
Expatriate soccer players in South Africa
SV Mattersburg players
Kapfenberger SV players
Kaizer Chiefs F.C. players
1982 births
Living people
Association football goalkeepers
People from Oberwart
Footballers from Burgenland